Albert Cox may refer to:
Albert Cox (footballer) (1917–2003), English footballer
Albert Prince-Cox (1890–1967), footballer and boxer
Abbie Cox (Albert Edward Cox, 1902–1985), ice hockey player
Albert Lyman Cox (1883–1965), attorney, state legislator, state judge, and U.S. Army general

See also
Alfred Conkling Coxe Sr., American judge
Alfred Conkling Coxe Jr., American judge